Jean Harrasse (13 February 1887 – 13 July 1973) was a French wrestler. He competed in the freestyle featherweight event at the 1920 Summer Olympics.

References

External links
 

1887 births
1973 deaths
Olympic wrestlers of France
Wrestlers at the 1920 Summer Olympics
French male sport wrestlers
Place of birth missing